Azadirachta indica, commonly known as neem, nimtree or Indian lilac, is a tree in the mahogany family Meliaceae. It is one of two species in the genus Azadirachta, and is native to the Indian subcontinent. It is typically grown in tropical and semi-tropical regions. Neem trees also grow on islands in southern Iran. Its fruits and seeds are the source of neem oil.

Description

It is evergreen, shedding many of its leaves during the dry winter months. The branches are wide and spreading. The neem tree is similar in appearance to its relative, the chinaberry (Melia azedarach).

The terminal leaflet often is missing. The petioles are short.

The inflorescences, which branch up to the third degree, bear from 250 to 300 flowers. Protandrous, bisexual flowers and male flowers exist on the same individual tree.

The fruit skin (exocarp) is thin and the bitter-sweet pulp (mesocarp) is yellowish-white and very fibrous. The white, hard inner shell (endocarp) of the fruit encloses one, rarely two, or three, elongated seeds (kernels) having a brown seed coat.

The neem tree is often confused with a similar looking tree called bakain. Bakain also has toothed leaflets and similar looking fruit. One difference is that neem leaves are pinnate but bakain leaves are twice- and thrice-pinnate.

Etymology
Neem (नीम/نیم) is a Hindustani noun derived from Sanskrit Nimba (निंब).

Ecology
The neem tree is noted for its drought resistance. It can grow in regions with an annual rainfall below 400 mm, but in such cases it depends largely on ground water levels. Neem can grow in many different types of soil, but it thrives best on well drained deep and sandy soils. It can tolerate high to very high temperatures and does not tolerate temperature below . Neem is one of a very few shade-giving trees that thrive in drought-prone areas e.g. the dry coastal, southern districts of India and Pakistan. The trees are not at all delicate about water quality and thrive on the merest trickle of water, whatever the quality. In India and tropical countries where the Indian diaspora has reached, it is very common to see neem trees used for shade lining streets, around temples, schools and other such public buildings or in most people's back yards. In very dry areas the trees are planted on large tracts of land.

Weed status
Neem is considered as a weed in many areas, including some parts of the Middle East, most of Sub-Saharan Africa including West Africa and Indian Ocean states, and some parts of Australia. Ecologically, it survives well in similar environments to its own, but its weed potential has not been fully assessed.

In April 2015, A. indica was declared a class B and C weed in the Northern Territory, Australia, meaning its growth and spread must be controlled and plants or propagules are not allowed to be brought into the NT. It is illegal to buy, sell, or transport the plants or seeds. Its declaration as a weed came in response to its invasion of waterways in the "Top End" of the territory.

After being introduced into Australia, possibly in the 1940s, A. indica was originally planted in the Northern Territory to provide shade for cattle. Trial plantations were established between the 1960s and 1980s in Darwin, Queensland, and Western Australia, but the Australian neem industry did not prove viable. The tree has now spread into the savanna, particularly around waterways, and naturalised populations exist in several areas.

Phytochemicals
Neem fruit, seeds, leaves, stems, and bark contain diverse phytochemicals, some of which were first discovered in azadirachta seed extracts, such as azadirachtin established in the 1960s as an insect antifeedant, growth disruptor, and insecticide. The yield of azadirachtin from crushing 2 kg of seeds is about 5 g.

In addition to azadirachtin and related limonoids, the seed oil contains glycerides, diverse polyphenols, nimbolide, triterpenes, and beta-sitosterol. The yellow, bitter oil has a garlic-like odor and contains about 2% of limonoid compounds. The leaves contain quercetin, catechins, carotenes, and vitamin C.

Uses

Neem leaves are dried in India and placed in cupboards to prevent insects eating the clothes, and also in tins where rice is stored. The flowers are also used in many Indian festivals like Ugadi. See below: #Association with Hindu festivals in India.

As a vegetable

The tender shoots and flowers of the neem tree are eaten as a vegetable in India. A soup-like dish called  in Tamil (translated as "neem flower rasam") made of the flower of neem is prepared in Tamil Nadu. In Bengal, young neem leaves are fried in oil with tiny pieces of eggplant. The dish is called  and is the first item during a Bengali meal that acts as an appetizer. It is eaten with rice.

Even if lightly cooked, the flavour is quite bitter, and the food is not consumed by all inhabitants of these nations. In Myanmar, young neem leaves and flower buds are boiled with tamarind fruit to soften its bitterness and eaten as a vegetable. Pickled neem leaves are also eaten with tomato and fish paste sauce in Myanmar.

Traditional medicine
Products made from neem trees have been used in the traditional medicine of India for centuries, for treating skin troubles and rheumatism, but there is insufficient clinical evidence to indicate any benefits of using neem for medicinal purposes. In adults, no specific doses have been established, and short-term use of neem appears to be safe, while long-term use may harm the kidneys or liver; in small children, neem oil is toxic and can lead to death. Neem may also cause miscarriages, infertility, and low blood sugar. The entire tree including its leaves, flowers, seeds, fruits, roots and bark have been utilised in traditional medicine for various treatments such as inflammation, infections, fever, skin diseases and dental disorders. The medicinal utilities have been described in particular for the neem leaf.

Pest and disease control
Neem is a key ingredient in non-pesticidal management (NPM), providing a natural alternative to synthetic pesticides. Neem seeds are ground into powder that is soaked overnight in water and sprayed on the crop. To be effective, it must be applied repeatedly, at least every ten days. Neem does not directly kill insects. It acts as an anti-feedant, repellent, and egg-laying deterrent and thus protects the crop from damage. The insects starve and die within a few days. Neem also suppresses the subsequent hatching of their eggs. Neem-based fertilizers have been effective against southern armyworm. Neem cake may be used as a fertilizer.

Neem oil has been shown to avert termite attack as an ecofriendly and economical agent.

Neem oil for polymeric resins
Applications of neem oil in the preparation of polymeric resins have been documented in recent reports. The synthesis of various alkyd resins from neem oil is reported using a monoglyceride (MG) route and their utilization for the preparation of PU coatings. The alkyds are prepared from reaction of conventional divalent acid materials like phthalic and maleic anhydrides with MG of neem oil.

Other uses
 Tree: the neem tree is of great importance for its anti-desertification properties and possibly as a good carbon dioxide sink. It is also used for maintaining soil fertility.
Fertilizer: neem extract is added to fertilizers (urea) as a nitrification inhibitor.
Animal feed: neem leaves can be occasionally used as forage for ruminants and rabbits.
Teeth cleaning: neem has traditionally been used as a type of teeth-cleaning twig.
Neem leaves are used in ecoprinting (botanical printing) onto fabric in parts of Asia.

Safety issues
According to the American Journal of Neuroradiology, neem oil has the ability to cause some forms of toxic encephalopathy and ophthalmopathy if consumed in quantities exceeding 150ml (5.07 us fluid ounces).

Claimed effectiveness against COVID-19
In March 2020, claims were circulated on social media in various Southeast Asian countries and Africa, supporting the use of neem leaves to treat COVID-19. The Malaysian Ministry of Health summarized myths related to using the leaves to treat COVID-19, and warned of health risks from over-consumption of the leaves. Neem Bark is currently being studied as a potential to treat COVID-19.

Genome and transcriptomes
Neem genome and transcriptomes from various organs have been sequenced, analyzed, and published by Ganit Labs in Bangalore, India.

ESTs were identify by generation of subtractive hybridization libraries of neem fruit, leaf, fruit mesocarp, and fruit endocarp by CSIR-CIMAP Lucknow.

Cultural and social impact

The name Nimai ('born under a neem tree'), of the Bhakti movement Vaishnava saint and Chaitanya Mahaprabhu (believed to be an incarnation of Radha Krishna in Gaudiya Vaishnavism and ISKCON) is due to his birth under a neem tree.

In 1995, the European Patent Office (EPO) granted a patent on an anti-fungal product derived from neem to the United States Department of Agriculture and W. R. Grace and Company. The Indian government challenged the patent when it was granted, claiming that the process for which the patent had been granted had been in use in India for more than 2,000 years. In 2000, the EPO ruled in India's favour, but W. R. Grace appealed, claiming that prior art about the product had never been published in a scientific journal. On 8 March 2005, that appeal was lost and the EPO revoked the Neem patent.

Biotechnology
The biopesticide produced by extraction from the tree seeds contains limonoid triterpenes. Currently, the extraction process has disadvantages such as contamination with fungi and heterogeneity in the content of limonoids due to genetic, climatic, and geographical variations. To overcome these problems, production of limonoids from plant cell suspension and hairy root cultures in bioreactors has been studied, including the development of a two-stage bioreactor process that enhances growth and production of limonoids with cell suspension cultures of A. indica.

Gallery

See also

 Azadirachtin
 Ayurveda
 Arid Forest Research Institute (AFRI)
 Neem cake
 Neem oil
 Babool (brand) of toothpaste
 Teeth cleaning twig (datun)

References

External links

  PDF Copy
 Invasiveness information from Pacific Island Ecosystems at Risk (PIER)
 Neem information from the Hawaiian Ecosystems at Risk project (HEAR)
 Contains a detailed monograph on Azadirachta indica (Neem; Nimba) as well as a discussion of health benefits and usage in clinical practice.

Plants used in Ayurveda
indica
Trees of the Indian subcontinent
Plants in Hinduism